Stephen Oppenheimer (born 1947) is a British paediatrician, geneticist, and writer.  He is a graduate of Balliol College, Oxford and an honorary fellow of the Liverpool School of Tropical Medicine.  In addition to his work in medicine and tropical diseases, he has published popular works in the fields of genetics and human prehistory.  This latter work has been the subject of a number of television and film projects.

Career 
Oppenheimer trained in medicine at Oxford and London universities, qualifying in 1971.  From 1972 he worked as a clinical paediatrician, mainly in Malaysia, Nepal and Papua New Guinea.  He carried out and published clinical research in the areas of nutrition, infectious disease (including malaria), and genetics, focussing on the interactions between nutrition, genetics and infection, in particular iron nutrition, thalassaemia and malaria.  From 1979 he moved into medical research and teaching, with positions at the Liverpool School of Tropical Medicine, Oxford University, a research centre in Kilifi, Kenya, and the Universiti Sains Malaysia in Penang.

He spent three years undertaking fieldwork in Papua New Guinea, studying the effects of iron supplementation on susceptibility to infection.  His fieldwork, published in the late 1980s, identified the role of genetic mutation in malarious areas as a result of natural selection due to its protective effect against malaria, and that different genotypes for alpha-thalassaemia traced different migrations out to the Pacific.  Following that work, he concentrated on researching the use of unique genetic mutations as markers of ancient migrations.

From 1990 to 1994 Oppenheimer served as chairman and chief of clinical service in the Department of Paediatrics in the Chinese University of Hong Kong. He worked as senior specialist paediatrician in Brunei from 1994 to 1996.  He returned to England in 1997, writing the book Eden in the East: the drowned continent of Southeast Asia, published in 1998.  The book synthesised work across a range of disciplines, including oceanography, archaeology, linguistics, social anthropology and human genetics.

He continued to write books and articles, and began a second career as a researcher and popular-science writer on human prehistory. He worked as consultant on two television documentary series,  The Real Eve (Discovery Channel) and Out of Eden (Channel 4), and published a second book, Out of Eden: the Peopling of the World (retitled The Real Eve in USA).  This was followed in 2006 by The Origins of the British: a genetic detective story, on the post-glacial peopling of Great Britain and Ireland.  In 2009 he was consultant on the BBC TV series The Incredible Human Journey.

Books by Oppenheimer 

 Eden in the East. 1999, Phoenix (Orion) 
 Out of Eden. 2004, Constable and Robinson  UK title of The Real Eve.
 The Real Eve. Carroll & Graf; (9 September 2004)  US title of Out of Eden.
 The Origins of the British – A Genetic Detective Story. 2006, Constable and Robinson. . (Paperback, 2007, Constable & Robinson. ).

Eden in the East 
In his book Eden in the East: The Drowned Continent of Southeast Asia, published in 1998, Oppenheimer argues that the rise in ocean levels that accompanied the waning of the ice age—as much as —during the period 14,000–7,000 years ago, must be taken into account when trying to understand the flow of genes and culture in Eurasia. Citing evidence from geology, archaeology, genetics, linguistics, and folklore, he hypothesizes that the Southeast Asian subcontinent of Sundaland was home to a rich and original culture that was dispersed when Sundaland was mostly submerged and its population moved westward. According to Oppenheimer, Sundaland's culture may have reached India and Mesopotamia, becoming the root for the innovative cultures that developed in those areas. He also suggests that the Austronesian languages originate from Sundaland and that a Neolithic Revolution may have started there.

The Real Eve (documentary and US book title) / Out of Eden (UK book title) 

In 2002, Oppenheimer worked as consultant on a television documentary series, The Real Eve, produced by the American cable TV network the Discovery Channel and directed by Andrew Piddington.  The series was known as Where We Came From in the United Kingdom.
The "Eve" in the title refers to Mitochondrial Eve, a name used for the most recent common ancestor of all humans in the matrilineal (mother to daughter) line of descent.

Following the series, Oppenheimer published a book on the same theme, originally titled Out of Eden in the UK and republished as The Real Eve in the US.  This work, published in 2004, focuses on Oppenheimer's hypothesis: that approximately 85 thousand years ago, a group of modern humans migrated from East Africa across the Red Sea to South Asia in a single major exodus numbering no more than a few hundred individuals. This lone group of wanderers, he suggests, were the ancestors of all the peoples of the earth except sub-Saharan Africans, their descendants having since migrated all over the Eurasian continent, North Africa, the Pacific islands, and the New World, and radiated into a plurality of physical characteristics, languages, ethnicities and cultures as seen today.

Origins of the British 
In his 2006 book The Origins of the British (revised in 2007), Oppenheimer argued that neither Anglo-Saxons nor Celts had much impact on the genetics of the inhabitants of the British Isles, and that British ancestry mainly traces back to the Palaeolithic Iberian people, now represented best by Basques, instead. He also argued that the Scandinavian input has been underestimated. He published an introduction to his book in Prospect magazine and answered some of his critics in a further Prospect magazine article in June 2007. Recent archaeogenetics studies have contradicted Oppenheimer's theory,
indicating a population replacement in Britain by a migration of Early European Farmers, ultimately from the Aegean, after c. 4,000 BCE, and another population replacement around the middle of the third millennium BCE, when a migration of Bell Beaker groups carrying significant levels of Steppe Ancestry resulted in the replacement of around 90% of the gene pool in Britain.

See also 
 James Burnett, Lord Monboddo, earliest philosopher to formulate the one-source theory
 Jared Diamond
 Robert A. Foley
 Toomas Kivisild
 Luigi Luca Cavalli-Sforza
 Chris Stringer
 Bryan Sykes

References

External links 

 "Journey of Mankind"
 Review of Oppenheimer's Eden in the East
  "Look who was talking", Article by Stephen Oppenheimer, The Guardian, 7 August 2003
 "Fast trains, slow boats, and the ancestry of the Polynesian islanders", link to an article by Stephen Oppenheimer & Martin Richards, Science Progress, 22 September 2001
 Discovery Program Q&A with Stephen Oppenheimer on the "Real Eve"
 "Myths of British ancestry", Article by Stephen Oppenheimer, Prospect Magazine, October 2006
  New York Times article: "A United Kingdom? Maybe"

1947 births
Living people
British geneticists
People educated at The Dragon School
British science writers
Recent African origin of modern humans
British Jews
British people of German-Jewish descent
Alumni of Balliol College, Oxford
Alumni of Green College, Oxford